Sir John Joseph Sheil (born 19 June 1938) is a retired Northern Irish judge. He was a High Court Judge of Northern Ireland from 1989 to 2004, and a Lord Justice of Appeal of Northern Ireland from 2004 to 2007.

Early life and education
Sheil was born on 19 June 1938. He was educated at Clongowes Wood College, an all-boys voluntary secondary school in County Kildare, Ireland where his twin brother, Fr. Michael Shiel SJ, is currently rector. He then studied at Queen's University Belfast and Trinity College Dublin.

Career
In 1964, Sheil was called to the bar of Northern Ireland and began practising as a barrister. He was made a Queen's Counsel (QC) in 1975. #he was Chairman of the Mental Health Review Tribunal from 1985 to 1987, and was a member of the Fair Employment Appeals Board from 1986 to 1989.

In 1989, Sheil was made a High Court Judge of Northern Ireland. He served as a Lord Justice of Appeal in Northern Ireland from September 2004 to 31 December 2006. He retired from the judiciary at the end of 2006.

Since 1 September 2010, Sheil has been a Surveillance Commissioner. As this position has a three-year term, he was reappointed on 1 September 2013, and again on 1 September 2016.

Honours
In 1989, Sheil was knighted as a Knight Bachelor. On 5 Nov 1996, he was elected an Honorary Bencher of Gray's Inn. On 16 May 2005, he was elected an Honorary Bencher of Middle Temple. In 2005, he was appointed a Privy Counsellor.

References

1938 births
Living people
Alumni of Queen's University Belfast
Alumni of Trinity College Dublin
Irish barristers
Knights Bachelor
Lords Justices of Appeal
Members of Gray's Inn
Members of the Privy Council of the United Kingdom
20th-century King's Counsel
High Court judges of Northern Ireland
Lords Justice of Appeal of Northern Ireland
People educated at Clongowes Wood College
Northern Ireland King's Counsel